Antonio Bruni may refer to:

Antonio Bartolomeo Bruni, an Italian violinist, composer and conductor
Antonio Bruni (merchant), an Albanian commander and spy
Antonio Bruni (poet), an Italian poet